William Sloan may refer to:

 William Gibson Sloan (1838–1914), Scottish evangelist 
 William Sloan (politician) (1867–1928), Canadian businessman and politician
 William Elvis Sloan (1867–1961), American inventor
 William Sloan (baseball) (1886–1931), American baseball player
 William Glenn Sloan (1888–1987), American inventor and scientist
 William Boyd Sloan (1895–1970), U.S. judge

See also
 Bill Sloan
 William Sloane (disambiguation)